Maytenus jamesonii is a species of plant in the family Celastraceae. It is a tree endemic to Ecuador.  Its natural habitat is subtropical or tropical moist montane forests. It is threatened by habitat loss.

References

jamesonii
Endemic flora of Ecuador
Trees of Ecuador
Endangered flora of South America
Taxonomy articles created by Polbot